Couturelle is a commune in the Pas-de-Calais department in the Hauts-de-France region of France.

Geography
A small farming village located 15 miles (25 km) southwest of Arras at the junction of the D25 and D23 roads, on the border with the department of the Somme.

Population

Places of interest
 The church of St.Thomas, dating from the nineteenth century.
 The Commonwealth War Graves Commission cemetery.
 Remains of a 13th-century castle.
 The eighteenth-century chateau.

See also
Communes of the Pas-de-Calais department

References

External links

 CWGC graves in the commune’s cemetery

Communes of Pas-de-Calais